The Frankfurt Marathon (official name as of 2016: Mainova Frankfurt Marathon, until 2015: BMW Frankfurt Marathon, until 2010: Commerzbank Frankfurt Marathon) is a marathon which has taken place every year in Frankfurt am Main since its inception in 1981. It is the longest-established city marathon in Germany and in terms of the number of finishers, Germany's second-largest.  It is organised by the agency motion events.

History

Five years after the first New York City Marathon, it was decided that the time was right to launch marathons within German cities. The OSC Hoechst 1960 athletics club organised the first Frankfurt Marathon in 1981, with Hoechst itself serving as the main sponsors.  During the course of the same year, the Berlin Marathon and the Rhein-Ruhr-Marathon were also run for the first time.

Despite the number of finishers continually rising from 2588 in its first year to 7297 in 1985, Hoechst stopped organising the event. As a consequence, the marathon did not take place in 1986. In 1987 the city of Frankfurt and the athletics department of Eintracht Frankfurt reinstated the race.  The date was moved to October and the Messegelände (exhibition grounds) became the new site for the start and finish.

The 2020 edition of the race was cancelled due to the coronavirus pandemic.

Course

The start of the course is on the Friedrich-Ebert-Anlage next to the iconic Messeturm.  Upon reaching the Platz der Republik the course turns left into Mainzer Landstrasse. After a lap of the Taunusanlage athletes return to the start of the course and continue onwards to the Bockenheimer Warte, before going to the Alter Oper via Bockenheimer Landstrasse.  The course then continues along Reuterweg and Bremer Strasse in a northerly direction as far as the Westend Campus at the University of Frankfurt, before returning to Opernplatz via Eschersheimer Landstrasse and the Bockenheimer Anlage.  Continuing into Junghofstrasse the course heads into Roßmarkt then past the Frankfurt Stock Exchange, the Eschenheimer Tor and the Friedberger Tor before turning south towards and over the Alte Brücke over the River Main which brings the athletes into the suburb of Sachsenhausen on the southern side of the river.  Athletes then run parallel to the Main in a westerly direction into the suburbs of Niederrad and Schwanheim. The only notable ascent on the course occurs at the bridge back over the Main in Schwanheim, and the participants continue westwards to the Bolangaropalast in Hoechst, Frankfurt's most westerly suburb. Athletes then turn back towards the city centre and run through the suburb of Nied via the Mainzer Landstrasse.  The Galluswarte can be seen after 34 kilometres and the Alter Oper after 36.  The course then continues along  and Kaiserstrasse past the Taunusanlage and then the Roßmarkt is negotiated for the second time to Eschenheim. The last three kilometres go back past the Alter Oper and via the Platz der Republik into the Festhalle, where athletes run the last few metres on a specially-laid red carpet before crossing the finishing line.

The Hammering Man is regarded as an unofficial symbol of the race.

Winners 
Key:

Multiple wins

By country

Notes

References

External links 
Official website
Association of Road Racing Statisticians entry

 
Recurring sporting events established in 1981
1981 establishments in West Germany